The 1986 winners of the Torneo di Viareggio (in English, the Viareggio Tournament, officially the Viareggio Cup World Football Tournament Coppa Carnevale), the annual youth football tournament held in Viareggio, Tuscany, are listed below.

Format
The 16 teams are seeded in 4 groups. Each team from a group meets the others in a single tie. The winner of each group progress to the final knockout stage.

Participating teams
Italian teams

  Fiorentina
  Genoa
  Inter Milan
  Milan
  Napoli
  Roma
  Sampdoria
  Torino

European teams

  Dukla Prague
  Bayern Munich
  Aberdeen
  Ferencváros

American teams

  Platense
  Nacional
  Ocean Syde

African teams
  Nairobi

Group stage

Group A

Group B

Group C

Group D

Knockout stage

Champions

Footnotes

External links
 Official Site (Italian)
 Results on RSSSF.com

1983
1985–86 in Italian football
1985–86 in Czechoslovak football
1985–86 in Scottish football
1985–86 in German football
1985–86 in Romanian football
1985–86 in Hungarian football
1985–86 in Argentine football
1986 in American soccer
1986 in Kenya
1986 in Uruguayan football